The King Alfonso XIII's Cup 1928–29 was the 29th staging of the Copa del Rey, the Spanish football cup competition.

The competition started on December 8, 1928, and concluded on February 3, 1929, with the final, held at the Estadio Mestalla in Valencia. RCD Español won the competition for the first time.

Teams
32 teams entered the competition, making a new record of participants. Navarre and the Canary Islands sent their champions for the first time. Catalonia, the Centre Region, Gipuzkoa sent three teams each. The rest of communities sent their champions and runners-up.

Aragon: Iberia SC, Patria Aragón
Asturias: Real Oviedo, Sporting de Gijón
Balearic Islands: CD Alfonso XIII
Canary Islands: Marino FC
Cantabria: Racing de Santander, Gimnástica de Torrelavega
Castile and León: Cultural y Deportiva Leonesa, Real Valladolid
Catalonia: FC Barcelona, CD Europa, RCD Español
Extremadura: CF Extremeño
Galicia: Celta de Vigo, Racing de Ferrol
Gipuzkoa: Real Unión, Real Sociedad, CD Logroño
Murcia: Real Murcia, Elche CF
Navarre: CA Osasuna
 Centre Region: Real Madrid, Athletic Madrid, Racing de Madrid
 South Region: Sevilla FC, Real Betis
Valencia: Valencia CF, CD Castellón
 Biscay: Athletic Bilbao, Arenas Club de Getxo
 Álava:  CD Alavés

Results

Bracket

Round of 32

|}
 Tiebreaker

|}

Round of 16

|}

Quarter-finals

|}

Semi-finals

|}

Final

References

External links
 www.linguasport.com 
 RSSSF.com

1928-29
Copa del Rey
Copa del Rey